Kristine Næss (born 10 May 1964) is a Norwegian writer.

She was born in Oslo. Novels include Sonja (1998), Rita blir forfatter (2002) and Hannahs historie med Heddy (2008). She has also issued the poetry collection Obladi (1996) and the story collection Stridig (2004).

References

1964 births
Living people
20th-century Norwegian novelists
21st-century Norwegian novelists
20th-century Norwegian poets
Writers from Oslo
Norwegian women novelists
Norwegian women poets
21st-century Norwegian women writers
20th-century Norwegian women writers